Ginkgotoxin (4'-O-methylpyridoxine) is a neurotoxin naturally occurring in Ginkgo biloba. It is an antivitamin structurally related to vitamin B6 (pyridoxine). It has the capacity to induce epileptic seizures.

Occurrence 
Seeds and phytopharmaceuticals derived from the plant Ginkgo biloba are dietary supplements used to improve memory, brain metabolism, and blood flow, and to treat neuronal disorders. It has been long used for a wide range of medicinal purposes. For instance, in Japan and China, Ginkgo biloba is used to treat cough, bronchial asthma, irritable bladder and alcohol use disorder.

Ginkgotoxin is found in the seeds and, in lesser amounts, in the leaves of Ginkgo biloba. The seeds can be consumed as is and the leaves can be used to prepare the dietary supplements. Analyses of raw seeds from eight different location in Japan by high-performance liquid chromatography showed concentrations of ginkgotoxin varying from 0.173 to 0.4 mg/g of seeds. Also, there is a seasonal variation of ginkgotoxin concentration in the seeds. The maximum has been observed in August. Analyses of the powder of Ginkgo biloba capsules revealed the presence of ginkgotoxin. However, as the leaves contain very small amounts that are not of toxicological relevance, it shouldn't pose any threat to the consumers.

Ginkgotoxin-5'-glucoside is a derivative of ginkgotoxin that possesses a glycosyl in the 5' position. Its content is higher than the concentration of ginkgotoxin in heated seeds (boiled or roasted). Liberation of ginkgotoxin by enzymatic hydrolysis of the glycosidic linkage is possible. Nevertheless, the toxicity of the mechanism of action glucoside form is not fully understood.

Ginkgotoxin can also be found in other plants of the genus Albizia. However, these plants have no known dietary use for humans, so their production of ginkgotoxin is of lesser concern.

Biosynthesis 
Ginkgotoxin is the 4'-O-methyl derivative of vitamin B6 (pyridoxine), but the presence of the vitamin is not required for the biosynthesis of ginkgotoxin. It indicates that the pyridoxine system can be synthesized de novo in the cells of Ginkgo biloba.  The first step of the biosynthesis involves ribulose 5-phosphate and dihydroxyacetone phosphate. They react in the presence of a synthase complex consisting of Pdx1 and Pdx2, and form pyridoxal phosphate. The second step is hypothetical and consists of the removal of a hydride in the presence of a dehydrogenase to produce pyridoxine. The last step involves the O-methylation of pyridoxine to form 4'-O-methylpyridoxine (ginkgotoxin).

Toxicity 
A few cases reported poisoning from commercially available products. The consumption of seeds represent a greater concern. Indeed, overconsumption of Ginkgo biloba seeds, especially by children, can result in loss of consciousness, convulsions and even death.

Ginkgotoxin is structurally related to vitamin B6. It is suggested that ginkgotoxin interferes with the synthesis of the vitamin by decreasing the activity of pyridoxal kinase in mammals. This decrease leads to the decreased availability of glutamate decarboxylase. In turn, it causes an imbalance between excitation and inhibition of neurotransmitters. This results in epileptic seizures. The toxicity of ginkgotoxin can consequently be relieved by taking vitamin B6 supplements.

References

External links

Neurotoxins
Hydroxypyridines
Vitamin B6 antagonists
Convulsants
Plant toxins